The ELEAGUE Major: Boston 2018, also known as ELEAGUE Major 2018 or Boston 2018, was the twelfth Counter-Strike: Global Offensive Major Championship and the second organized by ELEAGUE. The group stage was held in Atlanta, Georgia, United States from January 12 to January 22, 2018, and the playoff stage took place at the Agganis Arena in Boston, Massachusetts, United States from January 26 to January 28, 2018. It featured 24 professional teams from around the world, as ELEAGUE and Valve agreed to expand the Major from the usual 16. All 16 teams from the previous major, PGL Major: Kraków 2017, directly qualified for the Major, while another eight teams qualified through their respective regional qualifiers. Boston 2018 was the fifth consecutive Major with a prize pool of $1,000,000. This was also the first CS:GO Major to take place in two cities.

SK Gaming and Fnatic were the only entering Legends to advance to the playoff stage and retain their Legend status: the fewest in Major history. The two teams continued their respective streaks of making the playoffs at all Majors attended, with Fnatic's run starting at Dreamhack Winter 2013 and SK Gaming's run starting at ESL One Katowice 2015 as Keyd Stars. The new Legends at Boston 2018 were FaZe Clan, G2 Esports, Natus Vincere, Quantum Bellator Fire, Cloud9, and mousesports. Defending champions Gambit Esports, along with 100 Thieves (formerly Immortals), Astralis, BIG, North, and Virtus.pro, lost their Legend status. This marked the first time in Major history that Astralis's core – Nicolai "dev1ce" Reedtz, Peter "dupreeh" Rothmann, and Andreas "Xyp9x" Højsleth – did not make the playoffs. This left Olof "olofmeister" Kajbjer of FaZe Clan and Freddy "KRIMZ" Johansson of Fnatic the two remaining players to have been Legends at all twelve majors.

The grand finals featured FaZe Clan, the favorite to win the tournament, and Cloud9, the second North American team to reach a Major final. FaZe defeated mousesports and Natus Vincere to reach the finals, while Cloud9 pulled off two upsets with wins against G2 Esports and SK Gaming. Cloud9 etched out the win over FaZe Clan to become the first North American team to win a Major. It would also mark just the fourth time in CS:GO history in which a North American team won a premier international event, after iBUYPOWER winning the ESEA Global Finals Season 15, Cloud9 winning ESL Pro League Season 4, and OpTic Gaming winning ELEAGUE Season 2.

Background
Counter-Strike: Global Offensive (CS:GO) is a multiplayer first-person shooter video game developed by Hidden Path Entertainment and Valve. It is the fourth game in the Counter-Strike series. In professional CS:GO, the Valve-sponsored Majors are the most prestigious tournaments.

The defending champion was Gambit Esports, which became the first Asian team, and just the second non-European team, to win a Major with their win at Kraków 2017. The Swedish team Fnatic attended as the most decorated CS:GO team in Major history, with three wins.

Format
On December 13, 2017, ELEAGUE announced a revamp of the Major format, designed by Valve and ELEAGUE. The offline qualifier preceding the Major would be rebranded as part of the main Major and be called the "New Challengers stage." The teams in this qualifier would be given in-game stickers and receive the associated revenue. Four regional Minors – Americas, Asia, CIS, and Europe – sent two teams each to the New Challengers stage, competing against the bottom eight teams from the previous Major, Kraków 2017. The New Challengers stage was a Swiss-system tournament that took place in Atlanta from January 19, 2018, to January 22, 2018.

The top eight teams moved on to the "New Legends stage", which replaced the group stages of previous Majors. This stage also included the eight Legends from the previous Major, creating a 16-team group stage similar to previous Majors. Like the Challengers stage, the Legends stage used a Swiss-system format, and the top eight teams from this stage moved on to the playoff round. The playoffs, now known as the "Champions stage", remained a single elimination, best-of-three bracket.

Map pool
The map pool remained the same as at the previous major, even though Valve released the new version of Dust II in October 2017.

Regional qualifiers
Each regional qualifier, called "Minors", featured eight teams, whether through direct invitation or through qualifiers. Each minor featured two groups of four teams; these groups were in GSL double elimination formats, which was the format used at every major until the ELEAGUE Major, with the initial matches and winners match being best of ones and the losers and decider series being best of three. Two teams of each group qualify for the bracket phase, which is a four team, double elimination, best of three bracket. Two teams qualify for the major qualifier from each minor.

Each minor also had a 50,000 prize pool with first place receiving 30,000, second place taking in 15,000, and third place raking in the last 5,000.

Asia Minor
The Asia Minor took place shortly after the major announcement. Eight teams were invited to the qualifier in Seoul, South Korea and no online, open, or closed qualifier took place. This caused some controversy as minors were intended for all teams to be able to qualify and had no chance to prove themselves; top Asian teams such as Recca eSports, Grayhound Gaming, and Risky Gaming had more success than the likes of The MongolZ and other teams in the minor but were not invited. The Asia Minor took place on October 26, 2017, to October 29, 2017.

CIS Minor
The Commonwealth of Independent States Minor took place on the same dates as the Asia Minor in Bucharest, Romania and used the same format as the Asia Minor.

Europe Minor
The Europe Minor took place on November 2, 2017, and ended on November 5, 2017. No team was invited to the minor, but eight teams – GODSENT, HellRaisers, Heroic, Ninjas in Pyjamas, OpTic Gaming, Space Soldiers, Team EnVyUs, and Team LDLC.com – were invited to the closed qualifier. Another eight teams qualified through an open qualifier, which was a 512 team bracket. There, the sixteen teams played in a Swiss group stage, with all matches played online. The final eight teams went on to go to Bucharest to determine which two teams would move on to the New Challenger stage.

The open qualifiers were played on the platform CEVO, as opposed to the more popular ESEA, which is run by ESL, and FACEIT as both had been used for the qualifiers in the past. However, ELEAGUE's decision to use CEVO spurred controversy in the community as CEVO's anti-cheat system was not as well developed as ESL or FACEIT, leading to many players, particularly in the Europe open qualifier, to play with cheats on. Many of these cheaters were banned mid-match, causing many forced forfeits in the 512 team bracket.

Americas Minor
The Americas Minor took place on the same dates as the Europe Minor in Toronto, Canada. Two teams were automatically invited to the minor: Team Liquid and Counter Logic Gaming. One team from the South American open also qualified for the tournament. The remaining five spots went to the top five teams in the North American open qualifier. There, eight teams were invited – , Ghost Gaming, Immortals, Luminosity Gaming, Misfits, NRG Esports, Rogue, and Splyce – and another eight teams qualified through an open qualifier.

Broadcast talent
The broadcast talent of the Boston major was announced on the same day as the preliminary group stage.

Desk host
 Richard Lewis
Stage host
 Sue "Smix" Lee
Master of Ceremonies
 Alex "Goldenboy" Mendez
Commentators

 Anders Blume
 James Bardolph
 Daniel "ddk" Kapadia
 Henry "HenryG" Greer
 Jason "moses" O'Toole
 Matthew "Sadokist" Trivett

Analysts

 Sean "seang@res" Gares
 Jordan "n0thing" Gilbert
 Janko "YNk" Paunović

The casters also served as analysts when not casting
Observers

 Heather "sapphiRe" Garozzo
 DJ "Prius" Kuntz

Broadcasts
The major was streamed in various languages across Twitch. ELEAGUE also streamed the major on its website and YouTube.

Teams competing

Controversy
Several problems arose from the Major. The most common complaint was that the announcement of the Major was announced so late that several players were not able to obtain visas to their Minors or the Major itself. In addition, Valve did not allow coaches Luis "peacemaker" Tadeu of TyLoo and Wilton "" Prado of Team Liquid to have their own stickers despite peacemaker standing in for Hansel "BnTeT" Ferdinand, who had visa issues, and  standing in for Lucas "steel" Lopes, who had to sit out due to rules regarding roster locks. peacemaker said on Twitter that he was unhappy with the way ELEAGUE and Valve were handling player roster locks and the sticker situation – as player situations, handled by ELEAGUE, amounted to teams having to play with their original rosters and fifty percent of sticker sales went directly to the players and organization – and the team was considering to forfeit its spot in the major since peacemaker's role was a coach and not a player. In addition, peacemaker left TyLoo beforehand to become the coach of the Danish organization Heroic. TyLoo later confirmed its absence at the major as Flash Gaming, the third-place finisher from the Asia Minor, set to take its place as peacemaker and TyLoo could not work out a deal together.

Another big complication in the Major were the aforementioned the rules on roster locks. Valve said that the tournament organizers, not Valve, were responsible for the rules on roster locks, and ELEAGUE rules stated that players that competed in any Minor or the Americas Minor closed qualifier cannot compete on a team that would participate in the Major. The roster locks themselves were not the issue; the main issue was why the roster locks were placed months in advance of the major. SK Gaming had placed João "" Vasconcellos on the inactive roster by his own request and brought in Ricardo "boltz" Prass in October; Nicolai "dev1ce" Reedtz of Astralis had medical issues in late November; and Team Liquid brought in Lucas "steel" Lopes in place of Peter "stanislaw" Jarguz in mid November, but these teams had to be forced to play with stand-ins. Most of the community and players were dissatisfied with the situation. This raised the question as to why Joakim "disco doplan" Gidetun was allowed to play with Epsilon eSports during the European qualifier and then played with Fnatic at the last ELEAGUE Major, but that situation doesn't apply with a few teams at the Boston 2018 Major. Shortly after losing to SK Gaming at ESL Pro League Season 6, FaZe Clan's Ladislav "GuardiaN" Kovács said that the Major would be devalued if teams such as SK Gaming would have to play with a stand-in rather than their complete rosters. SK Gaming's Epitácio "TACO" de Melo said the rule was "ridiculous" and went on to say that "I don't think majors are a big deal in CS:GO anymore." Journalist Jarek "DeKay" Lewis said that he tried to reach out to ELEAGUE in an effort for an explanation "to try and find out when and why the roster lock rule changed" but the organization never responded. A couple of weeks later, SK Gaming's captain Gabriel "FalleN" Toledo also wanted an explanation as to why ELEAGUE won't say anything about the roster locks, but ELEAGUE continued to stay quiet. Journalist Richard Lewis, who worked as the host for ELEAGUE at the time, said in one of his podcasts with Duncan "Thorin" Shields that roster locks are necessary in order for teams to not make changes before the Major to benefit them for the tournament. After defeating SK Gaming in the semifinals, Cloud9 lurker Timothy "" Ta also claimed that the system wasn't fair.

In the New Champions stage, the continuing argument of why the fourth quarterfinal series was played on the same day as the two semifinals was asked, as the first team in the second semifinals was much more rested than the second team in the semifinals, who only had a few hours of rest. After Cloud9 defeated SK Gaming in that second semifinals, SK's captain FalleN, SK's entry fragger Fernando "fer" Alvarenga, Fnatic's coach Jimmy "Jumpy" Berndtsson, and Cloud9's support player Will "RUSH" Wierzba all said that the system was unfair to the team who had to play two series in a day compared to the team who only needed to play one. Out of the seven Majors in which the fourth quarterfinal match was played in the same day as the semifinals, the winner of that quarterfinal lost five times in the semifinals.

Pre-major ranking
HLTV.org rank teams based on results of teams' performances. The rankings shown below reflect the January 8, 2018 rankings.

New Challengers stage
The Challengers stage, also known as the Preliminary stage and formerly known as the offline qualifier, will be a sixteen team swiss tournament: after the randomly-drawn Day 1 games, teams will play other teams with the same win–loss record. Every round will consist of one game. In addition, teams will not play the same team twice unless necessary and teams will be randomly chosen. Any team with three wins would qualify for the major, and any team with three losses would be eliminated. The Challenger stage will be played in Atlanta, Georgia, United States at the Turner Studios.

In the first round, teams from pool one will be matched up against teams in pool four. Teams in pool two will play teams in pool three. One team from a pool is randomly decided to face off against a randomly decided team in another pool. Cloud9, FlipSid3 Tactics, G2 Esports, and Natus Vincere (Na'Vi) were in pool one based on Cloud9, FlipSid3, and G2's ninth-place finish and Na'Vi's eleventh-place finish at the PGL Major; Na'Vi had the higher seed over Sprout Esports and mousesports as Na'Vi was already a Legend going into the PGL Major. Sprout, FaZe Clan, and Vega Squadron were in pool two based on the eleventh-place finish or the last place finish at the PGL Major. Renegades, AVANGAR, Space Soldiers, and Team Liquid were in pool three based on winning their respective minor qualifiers. Flash Gaming, Quantum Bellator Fire, Team EnVyUs, and Misfits Gaming were in pool four based on being the runners-up in their respective minor qualifiers.

In the second round, the winners in the first round will face each other in the "high" matches, in which teams with a 1–0 record will play against each other; the losers will face each other in the "low" matches, in which teams with a 0–1 record will play each other.

In the third round, the winners of the high matches (teams with 2-0 records) from round two will face each other. The winners of these two matches will qualify for the major. The losers of the high round and the winners of the low round (teams with 1-1 records) will face each other in the "mid" matches. The losers from the previous low matches (teams with 0-2 records) will face each other in round three's low matches. The losers of these low matches are eliminated. Twelve teams remain in the Challengers stage.

In the fourth round, the losers of the high matches and the winners of the mid matches (teams with 2-1 records) will face each other in round four's high matches. The winners of those high matches qualify for the major. The losers of the mid matches and the winners of the low matches (teams with 1-2 records) will face each other in the low matches of round four. The losers of these matches are eliminated from the major. Six teams remain.

In the last round, the remaining teams will face off (teams with 2-2 records). The winners of these matches will qualify for the Legends stage and the losing teams will be eliminated from the major. In the most ideal of situations, the Swiss format should allow teams to have a harder time each time they win and have an easier time each time they lose.

The first round matchups were announced on January 9, 2018. The New Challengers stage took place from January 12 to January 15.

Decider
After the conclusion of the first day, ELEAGUE and 100 Thieves, the runners-up of the last major, announced that the Brazilian roster would not attend due to immigration issues. To complete the sixteen team group stage for the New Legends stage, ELEAGUE decided to have one of the three ninth place teams take the open spot. The two teams with the easiest schedule from the three would face off in a best of one and then the winner of that match would go on to face off against the team that had the hardest schedule. The strength of schedule was determined by which how many wins the teams' opponents got. In the event in which the strength of schedule is the same, the tie breaker would be the head-to-head game. If the teams never played, then a random draw would take place.

Renegades and AVANGAR faced off in the first match after round 5. Karlo "USTILO" Pivac had a back and forth major performance, but as he stepped up, Jame bettered the Renegades with a 30 bomb as AVANGAR pulled off yet another upset despite a last minute heroic play from NAF. AVANGAR went back to Mirage. However, Liquid made it close late into the game as the Americans were able to punish the aggression of the Kazakhs on their Terrorist side and Liquid defeated the underdogs in overtime.

New Legends stage
The Legends stage, formerly known as the Group stage, used the same format as the Challengers stage. This took place from January 19 to January 22.

Gambit Esports, Virtus.pro, Astralis, BIG were teams in pool one based on their top four placement at the PGL Major; BIG was in pool one because of its first-place finish in the Swiss stage last major. Fnatic, North, SK Gaming, and Cloud9 were teams in pool two based on their quarterfinals finish at the PGL Major; Cloud9 was randomly chosen between it and G2 Esports based on its first-place finish in the Challengers stage. G2 Esports, Vega Squadron, Space Soldiers, and FaZe Clan were in pool three. mousesports, Natus Vincere, Quantum Bellator Fire, and Team Liquid were in pool four.

New Champions stage
The New Champions Stage is a best of three single elimination bracket. Teams play into overtime until a winner is decided. This stage took place at the Agganis Arena between January 26 and January 28.

Bracket

Quarterfinals

FaZe Clan vs. mousesports

Casters: Sadokist & HenryG

Natus Vincere vs. Quantum Bellator Fire

Casters: James Bardolph & ddk

G2 Esports vs. Cloud9

Casters: Anders Blume & moses

SK Gaming vs. Fnatic

Casters: James Bardolph & ddk

Semifinals

FaZe Clan vs. Natus Vincere

Casters: Sadokist & HenryG

Cloud9 vs. SK Gaming

Casters: Anders Blume & moses

Finals

Casters: James Bardolph & ddk

Skadoodle was named the U.S. Air Force MVP of the tournament by ELEAGUE, while HLTV.org gave the MVP to tarik.

The final map broke a new record with more than 1.8 million viewers, including more than 1.3 million viewers on Twitch.

Cloud9 became the first ever North American team to win a Major and it was the fourth Major in which a non-European team won the Major in five Major tournaments.

Final standings
The final placings are shown below. In addition, the prize distribution, seed for the next major, roster, and coaches are shown. Each team's in-game leader is shown first.

Post-major ranking
HLTV.org rank teams based on results of teams' performances. The rankings shown below reflect the January 29, 2018 rankings, the first ranking after the major.

1Change since January 8, 2018 ranking

References

2018 esports television series
2018 first-person shooter tournaments
2018 in Boston
2018 in sports in Massachusetts
Counter-Strike: Global Offensive Majors
International esports competitions hosted by the United States
January 2018 sports events in the United States
Sports competitions in Boston
ELeague competitions